Frank Tollan was a Scottish footballer who played in Scotland and the American Soccer League.

In the fall of 1929, Tollan signed with the New Bedford Whalers of the American Soccer League.  New Bedford released him after fourteen games and the New York Nationals had him play for one game.  He then spent time with an amateur team in the New York area.  In March 1930, Toner joined Bethlehem Steel.  Bethlehem withdrew from the league during the 1930 summer break and Tollan joined the New York Giants for the second half of the 1930 season as well as the 1931 season.  He was part of one of the most improbable comebacks as the Giants took the 1931 League Cup after losing the first game, 8-3, to the Whalers.  Tollan scored the second Giants goal in that game. Frank Tollan followed and supported Glasgow Celtic his entire life. Although raised in Hamilton his love of  the pure and passionate football that Celtic provided instantly made an impact on his and his entire family and friends life. He was noted as saying "Football without the fans is nothing" .

External links
 Bethlehem Steel: Frank Tollan

References

1901 births
People from Baillieston
American Soccer League (1921–1933) players
Bethlehem Steel F.C. (1907–1930) players
Cowdenbeath F.C. players
Hamilton Academical F.C. players
New Bedford Whalers players
New York Nationals (ASL) players
New York Giants (soccer) players
Scottish footballers
Year of death missing
Association football forwards
British emigrants to the United States